Saturn's Children is a 2008 science fiction novel by British author Charles Stross. Stross called it "a space opera and late-period [Robert A.] Heinlein tribute", specifically to Heinlein's 1982 novel Friday.

The novel was nominated for the 2009 Hugo Award for Best Novel, the 2009 Locus Award for Best Science Fiction Novel, and was a finalist for the 2009 Prometheus Award. An audiobook version narrated by Bianca Amato was released in 2009.

Plot
The novel chronicles the travels and perils of Freya Nakamichi-47, a gynoid in a distant future in which humanity is extinct and a near-feudal android society has spread throughout the galaxy. Wealthy and self-indulgent "aristos" own and have enslaved most of the populace; the remaining "free" androids struggle to keep themselves independent and can rarely afford the exorbitant costs of interplanetary travel. Freya, a robotic courtesan originally designed to please humans but activated a century after their mysterious extinction, is considered obsolete and works menial jobs to survive. When she offends an aristo and needs to escape off-world, she accepts a job as a courier for the mysterious Jeeves Corporation and becomes embroiled in a complex and dangerous war among factions conspiring against each other for control of society.

Influences
Saturn's Children is an homage to the works of Isaac Asimov and Robert A. Heinlein, in particular Heinlein's 1982 novel Friday. The novel opens with an explanation of Asimov’s Three Laws of Robotics, and then establishes that humans are extinct. Jesse Willis of SFFaudio.com commented:

Critical reception
Bookmarks magazine called the novel "a commentary on identity and free will in a post-human galaxy", adding:

Booklist praised Saturn's Children as “one of the most stylishly imaginative robot tales ever penned", and The Times described it as "a smart and playful romp.” The San Diego Union-Tribune called the novel “Good fun ... Heinlein himself would’ve liked this.” Calling it an "erotic futuristic thriller", Publishers Weekly pointed out that the novel contains "a deep message of how android slavery recapitulates humanity's past mistakes", but also suggests that Stross "struggles to make it heard over the moans and gunshots". Adrienne Martini of the Baltimore City Paper wrote that "Stross seems to be saying something about identity and class, but those larger ideas get buried in a labyrinthine plot that isn’t overly satisfying on its own," adding that "for a Heinlein fan, Saturn’s Children is an interesting game of spot the reference." Jesse Willis of SFFaudio.com wrote:

Saturn's Children was nominated for the 2009 Hugo Award for Best Novel, the 2009 Locus Award for Best Science Fiction Novel, and was a finalist for the 2009 Prometheus Award.

Sequels

Though Stross wrote Saturn's Children as a standalone novel, he published a short story sequel called "Bit Rot" in the 2010 anthology Engineering Infinity and later made it available online. In the story, a descendant android of Freya's named Lilith Nakamichi-47 is on a long interstellar voyage as a catastrophic event wreaks havoc on the spaceship and its occupants. Robert E. Waters of Tangent classified "Bit Rot" as "one of the hardest SF stories" in the anthology, and called it "one of the most clever zombie stories in recent memory." Lois Tilton of Locus agreed, calling it "an exceedingly neat idea for a space horror story, twisting the classic, and Stross, of course, works it out thoroughly well." Nigel Seel wrote for ScienceFiction.com:
 

In 2013 Stross released Neptune's Brood, a novel set later in the same universe as Saturn's Children, and called "Bit Rot" the "missing link" between the two novels.

References

External links
 
 
 Bit Rot, at Stross's official site
 
 
 
 
 
 
 

2008 science fiction novels
2008 British novels
British science fiction novels
Dystopian novels
Novels set on Mars
Novels by Charles Stross
Space opera novels
Fiction about trans-Neptunian objects
Novels set on Venus
Novels about androids
Novels about slavery
Orbit Books books